Walter Bruno was born in Montreal, Quebec, Canada. His career as a writer of plays includes three productions, Shouting for Joy and Hand-to-Hand, and, in collaboration, a translation of Alfred Jarry's Ubu the King, all staged in Toronto, Ontario. He was briefly playwright in residence at Toronto Free Theatre.

In 2004, Bruno translated Two English Girls and the Continent (Cambridge Book Review Press), the first translation into English of Deux Anglaises et le Continent by Henri-Pierre Roché (author of Jules and Jim). Two English Girls was the inspiration for François Truffaut's well-regarded adaptation of 1971 (see Two English Girls).

Bruno's poetry has been awarded prizes by Fiddlehead magazine and the Canadian Broadcasting Corporation. In 1996, his imprint, Authors Collective, published Long Shot Odyssey. In 2006, it published Cat Walk and Other Poems.

References

Living people
20th-century Canadian dramatists and playwrights
21st-century Canadian dramatists and playwrights
French–English translators
20th-century Canadian poets
20th-century Canadian male writers
Canadian male poets
21st-century Canadian poets
Writers from Montreal
1946 births
20th-century Canadian translators
21st-century Canadian translators
Canadian male dramatists and playwrights
21st-century Canadian male writers
Canadian male non-fiction writers